Lepidozonates is a genus of moths in the family Lecithoceridae.

Species
 Lepidozonates prominens Park, Heppner & Lee, 2013
 Lepidozonates tenebrosellus Park, 2013
 Lepidozonates viciniolus Park, 2013

References

Torodorinae
Moth genera